Cora barbulata is a species of basidiolichen in the family Hygrophoraceae. Found in Costa Rica, it was formally described as a new species in 2015 by Robert Lücking, Manuela Dal-Forno, and James Lawrey. The lichen occurs in upper montane cloud forests in the Costa Rican Cordillera de Talamanca where it grows as an epiphyte on páramo shrubs. The specific epithet barbulata refers to the beard-like concentric tomentose (woolly) rings of the upper lobe surfaces. Cora aspera, found in Central and South America, is somewhat similar in appearance and ecology, but is not closely related to C. barbulata.

References

barbulata
Lichen species
Lichens described in 2015
Lichens of Central America
Taxa named by James D. Lawrey
Taxa named by Robert Lücking
Basidiolichens